The 2016–17 season was Aluminij's second season in the Slovenian PrvaLiga, Slovenian top division, since the league was created. Aluminij competed in Slovenian PrvaLiga and Slovenian Football Cup.

Players
As of 11 December 2016

Source: NK Aluminij

Transfer

Pre-season and friendlies

Summer

Winter

Competitions

Overall

Overview
{| class="wikitable" style="text-align: center"
|-
!rowspan=2|Competition
!colspan=8|Record
|-
!
!
!
!
!
!
!
!
|-
| PrvaLiga

|-
| Cup

|-
! Total

PrvaLiga

League table

Results summary

Results by round

Matches

Cup

First round

Second round

Quarter-finals

Statistics

Goalscorers

Slovenian PrvaLiga

5 goals
 Žiga Škoflek

4 goals
 Josip Zeba

2 goals
 Lovro Bizjak

1 goal

 Robert Kurež
 Dejan Krljanović
 Nemanja Jakšić
 Blaž Kramer

Slovenian Football Cup
2 goal
 Žiga Škoflek

1 goal
 Milan Kocić
 Aleksandar Srdić

See also
2016–17 Slovenian PrvaLiga
2016–17 Slovenian Football Cup

References

External links
Official website 
PrvaLiga profile 
Soccerway profile

Slovenian football clubs 2016–17 season